Zandona is a surname. Notable people with the surname include:

Flavio Zandoná (born 1967), Argentine footballer
Gabrio Zandonà (born 1977), Italian sailor